Vesna Krezich Kittelson is a Croatian American painter.

Kittelson was born in Bosnia and Herzegovina and grew up in Split, Croatia.

Kittelson received her B.A. in law from the University of Split in 1970. She moved to the United States and attended the University of Minnesota. She earned her B.A. in studio arts in 1974 and her M.A. in design in 1978.

In 2009 Kittelson traveled to Cambridge, England where she became interested in Emma Wedgwood, wife of Charles Darwin. Kittelson created the installation Mrs. Darwin's Garden, a collection including paintings of garden fountains and strange flora with accordion folded books.  The installation was exhibited at Form + Content Gallery.

Kittelson's Young Americans was included in the Weisman Art Museum's Tenuous, Though Real exhibition.

Kittelson was a member of the Women's Art Registry of Minnesota (WARM). She taught at the Minneapolis College of Art and Design. She has received the Bush Artists Fellowship for Painting.

References

External links
Artist website

Living people
University of Minnesota alumni
University of Split alumni
Year of birth missing (living people)
American people of Bosnia and Herzegovina descent
American people of Croatian descent
Croats of Bosnia and Herzegovina